Jiří Homola (born 2 June 1980) is a Czech former professional footballer.

Club career
Homola played in his youth for Sokol Přerov nad Labem, SK Český Brod, Spartak Čelákovice, Slavia Prague and once more Spartak Čelákovice. In Čelákovice he joined the professional team during the 1998–99 season.

After only one year the defender was acquired by Gambrinus Liga club FK Jablonec 97, where he played until the end of 2002 and appeared in 61 league matches scoring six goals. In January 2003, Homola was acquired by Sparta Prague. At first he played regularly, although he made only seven league appearances in the 2004–05 season.

In summer 2005, he was removed from Sparta's first team and shortly thereafter transferred to the Turkish club Malatyaspor, where he spent one season. After one year Homola returned to Sparta Prague. In the beginning he often played, by the end of the second half of the season he was hardly used. In February 2007, he returned to his former club FK Jablonec. In summer of 2010, he left Jablonec and joined Karviná.

External links
 
 TTF statistics

1980 births
Living people
Czech footballers
Association football defenders
Czech Republic under-21 international footballers
Czech Republic youth international footballers
FK Jablonec players
AC Sparta Prague players
Malatyaspor footballers
MFK Karviná players
FC Dinamo Tbilisi players
Czech expatriate footballers
Süper Lig players
Czech First League players
Expatriate footballers in Turkey
FK Senica players
Slovak Super Liga players
Expatriate footballers in Slovakia
Erovnuli Liga players
Expatriate footballers in Georgia (country)
Czech expatriate sportspeople in Turkey
Czech expatriate sportspeople in Slovakia
Czech expatriate sportspeople in Georgia (country)
People from Nymburk
Sportspeople from the Central Bohemian Region